Pasche is family name of German descent, with variations including Paasche and Pasch; it may refer to:

Alexandre Pasche (born 1991), Swiss football player
Alden Pasche (1910–1986), basketball head coach
John Pasche, British art designer
Matheus Pasche, Brazilian Economist
Valentine Pasche, a Swiss comics creator

See also
 Pasche New York, a company founded to promote the musical career of Ashley Alexandra Dupré
 Pasche Institute, an institute at Criswell College

German-language surnames